Timothy Martin Mulholland (born November 13, 1949) is a Brazilian-American professor. He is a Psychology graduate from Westmont College and obtained Master's and Doctoral degrees in Cognitive Psychology from the University of Pittsburgh.

Biography 
Mulholland was born in the United States but moved to Brazil with his family at the age of two. He holds a bachelor's degree in psychology from Westmont College (1971), a master's and a doctorate in cognitive psychology from the University of Pittsburgh (1974 and 1976, respectively).

Timothy was a professor at the University of Brasilia from 1976. As head of the university he held all the most important positions: Director of the Institute of Psychology, Head of the Rector's Office, Vice Rector from 1997 to 2005 and finally rector elected in 2005.

Mulholland holds both American and Brazilian citizenship. He became a Brazilian citizen in 1996.

He has three stepdaughters and two children, including Brazilian actress Rosanne Mulholland.

Complaint 

He was accused by the Public Prosecutor's Office of committing administrative impropriety. The accusation is that he would have spent R$470,000.00 reais (approximately US$117,000.00) for the purchase of a car and to furnish a functional apartment that he came to occupy with his family almost a year. The money would have come from an institutional development fund of the University of Brasilia. The case caught the attention of the public by the absurd amount of R$900 reais (approximately $225 dollars) spent on the purchase of a bin.

On April 4, 2008, UnB's rectory was occupied by students who demanded the departure of the Rector. Mulholland responded by saying that "he would not leave because he had been democratically elected". On April 10, however, Mulholland asked to be removed from office for sixty days, and soon afterwards he resigned.

Books

References

1949 births
Living people
21st-century American psychologists
Expatriate academics in Brazil
University of Pittsburgh alumni
Westmont College alumni
American expatriates in Brazil
Brazilian people of American descent
Brazilian psychologists
People with acquired Brazilian citizenship
20th-century American psychologists